The Art of Balance is the third album by American heavy metal band Shadows Fall, released on September 17, 2002. The album sold over 4,500 copies the week of its release, and debuted at position 15 on the Top Independent Albums chart. With this release being the first with Jason Bittner, the lineup was solidified onwards as it is today's current members and the longest lineup in Shadows Fall's career's history.

Background
The Art of Balance was the first studio album by the band to which the entire lineup contributed, meaning that no songs were re-recorded from older material (except for "Stepping Outside the Circle", which originally appeared on the EP Deadworld). Matthew Bachand explained that this unity created a better band and that, "this time, instead of eight Gothenburg death metal songs, we have ballads, rock songs, thrash tunes."

"Thoughts Without Words" was the album's first music video, featuring a simple band performance. The follow-up, "Destroyer of Senses," had the group performing in a snowed-in building and drinking with friends. "The Idiot Box" served as the basis for a final video, featuring the group's performance and backstage antics. All three videos saw significant airplay on MTV2 and Fuse TV.

Lyrical themes
Thematically, the album was inspired by the quest to find a perfect "balance" between melody and aggression. Lyrically, the album revolves around the fight against spiritually destructive forces. The song "Thoughts Without Words" was influenced by Chinese Buddhism and refers to the moment where, through meditation, a person's inspiration and expression become united.

The concept behind the album, as explained by Brian Fair: "It's the idea of oneness and unity between all people and all things. It's the idea that all systems begin from the same spark and it's something we get further away from. We're all in this together." Fair also explained that he came up with the title for the record, and it represents the "balance of melody and aggression," and the "process of trying to find that balance between the two."

The song "Thoughts Without Words" is "based around meditation and yoga," and on "trying to be able to calm the mind and experience things without constantly thinking them." In other words, being lost in the moment. "Destroyer of Senses" is about Fair's father's battle with alcoholism. Alcohol, or even certain experiences, can make one feel more alive ('Giver of life'), but at the same time affect the senses ('Destroyer of senses').

Track listing

Personnel

Shadows Fall
Brian Fair – lead vocals
Jon Donais – lead guitar, backing vocals
Matt Bachand – rhythm guitar, clean vocals
Paul Romanko – bass guitar
Jason Bittner – drums (1-10)

Additional credits
Produced, engineered, and mixed by Zeuss
Mastered by Alan Douches at West West Side Music in Tenafly, New Jersey
Art design and layout by Miked
Group photos by Justin Borucki
Live photo by Rev. Aaron Pepelis
Jim Weeks – drums and co-production on "Welcome to the Machine"
Dan Egan and Chris Bartlett – gang vocals on "Stepping Outside the Circle" and "Destroyer of Senses"

References

Art of Balance, The
Art of Balance, The
Century Media Records albums
Albums produced by Chris "Zeuss" Harris